Moshe Pennavayre (born 25 October 1971) is an Ivorian judoka. He competed in the men's half-middleweight event at the 1992 Summer Olympics.

References

External links
 

1971 births
Living people
Ivorian male judoka
Olympic judoka of Ivory Coast
Judoka at the 1992 Summer Olympics
Place of birth missing (living people)